Tune Group Sdn Bhd (or Tune Group Sendirian Berhad, meaning 'private limited') is a leisure and entertainment corporation founded by the Malaysian entrepreneurs Tony Fernandes and Kamarudin Meranun. Tune Group's mission is to provide affordability and accessibility to leisure activities and entertainment, primarily in Asian markets. It does this via its airline, hotel, telecommunication, financial services, sports, media and creative industries subsidiaries. Its subsidiaries include: budget airline AirAsia; Caterham Group, a motor engine-based technology company, through which it formerly owned the Caterham F1 Team; and Queens Park Rangers, an English football club. Tune Group was the official shirt sponsor of FA match officials until 2013.

Business 
Tune was founded in late 2001 with the purchase of AirAsia by Tune Air Sdn Bhd on 2 December 2001. In 2013, Tune Group expanded its low budget hotel business (Tune Hotels) in Australia.

In 2018, Tune Hotels are no longer managed by Tune Group and currently under the management of Ormond Group.

businesses 
AirAsia Berhad
Tune Talk Sdn Bhd
Tune Hotels Regional Services Sdn Bhd
Tune Money Sdn Bhd
Think Big Digital Sdn Bhd
Tune Protect Group Berhad
Tune Studios Sdn Bhd
QPR Asia Sdn Bhd
Tune Box Sdn Bhd
Educ8 Group Sdn Bhd
Caterham Group

Sponsorship 

Tune Group is a partner of The Football League and the FA Cup. It contracted to partner the Professional Games Match Officials (PGMO) for seven years and ran for three years for the course of the 2010–2011 season. Previously, PGMO was affiliated with the Tune Group subsidiary AirAsia.

See also 
 Tune Ventures

References

External links 
 Tune Group

2001 establishments in Malaysia
 
Privately held companies of Malaysia
Companies based in Kuala Lumpur
Malaysian brands